Manuelle "Emma" Daumas (born 23 November 1983, in Avignon) is a French singer-songwriter and performer, particularly well known for her participation in Star Academy.

Career
Daumas grew up in a family of music lovers. Her passion for music led her to write several songs by the age of 12. Her parents then allowed her to record her first song Stupid boy. After the piano, she took lessons in guitar, and enrolled at the academy of Villeuneuve-lès-Avignon at the age of 15. She frequently entered contests, in particular Mon Dieu of Édith Piaf. She came in 8th in the Laudun song contest playing one of her own compositions, Dis-moi pourquoi ("Tell me why").

From this point on, her potential not only as a singer but as a songwriter started to become noticed. At this time, she began to enter the scene by taking part at the galas of Pascal Fallais, her professor at the time, with songs like I'm sorry or Vivre from the musical Notre-Dame de Paris. Three years later, she eventually took first place at the song contest at Laudun.

In 2000, Daumas participated in Graines de stars, a live show hosted by Laurent Boyer. Her performance of Barbra Streisand's "Memory" allowed her to take fourth place. She waited to complete her literary Baccalauréat before pursuing music full time. Thus Emma continued her vocal training in 2001 and 2002 by taking singing lessons from vocal coach Maguy Vilette, and took guitar courses again for two months, because the musical style of pop rock attracted her. She learned more about the music scene by opening for acts such as Carlos, Éric Colado (comic of southern France), the groups Gold and Émile et Image, Noëlle Perna (a comedian from Nice), at the casino of Juan-les-Pins, but especially Michael Jones with the cabaret Le Rouge-Gorge at Avignon in November 2001, while doing odd jobs to make money. The publicity from the casting for Star Academy 2 will mark the end of a year of rich experiences.

Star Academy
In August 2002, she endeared herself with the public, but not in sufficient measure to defeat the eventual winner Nolwenn Leroy. Nevertheless, she reached the semi-final in the contest, and had the opportunity to sing duets with Bruno Pelletier, Serge Lama, Patrick Bruel, Youssou N'Dour and Ray Charles.

Discography

Albums 
 Le saut de l'Ange – her 2004 debut album received a mixed reception but the relatively hard-edged rock riffs in certain songs helped distance her from the pure commercial-pop image that tended to become a stigma for some singers who rose to prominence through Star Academy
 Effet secondaire – well-received 2006 follow-up album
 Le Chemin de la Maison – 2008 CD album.

Singles 
 Au jour le jour (2003)
 Si tu savais (2003)
 Tu seras (2004) – Gold disk
 Figurine humaine (2004)
 J'attends (2004)
 Someone (Laissons nous une chance) – song recorded with Hanson and released as a limited single plus as a track on the French version of Hanson's 2005 album Underneath
 You got me, Eskobar feat. Emma Daumas (2005)
 S'il te plaît (October 2005) – the first extract from her second album Effets secondaires, only available on download
 Regarde nous (April 2006)
 Club Addict Mon tombeur J'suis conne (June 2008) – first single from Chemin de la maison Secret défense'' (2009)

References

External links
Official website 

1983 births
Living people
Star Academy (France) participants
21st-century French singers
21st-century French women singers